The , originally the Hiroshima Prefectural Industrial Promotion Hall, and now commonly called the Genbaku Dome, is part of the Hiroshima Peace Memorial Park in Hiroshima, Japan and was designated a UNESCO World Heritage Site in 1996. The ruin of the hall serves as a memorial to the over 140,000 people who were killed in the atomic bombing of Hiroshima at the end of World War II. It is permanently kept in a state of arrested ruin as a reminder of the destructive effects of nuclear warfare.

History 
The Product Exhibition Hall building was originally designed by Czech architect Jan Letzel. The design included a distinctive dome at the top of the building.  It was completed in April 1915 and was named the Hiroshima Prefectural Commercial Exhibition (HMI). It was formally opened to the public in August that year. In 1921, the name was changed to the Hiroshima Prefectural Products Exhibition Hall, and again, in 1933, to the Hiroshima Prefectural Industrial Promotion Hall (広島県産業奨励館 Hiroshima-ken Sangyo Shourei-kan). The building was located in the large business district next to the Aioi Bridge and was primarily used for art and educational exhibitions.

Atomic bombing 

At 8:15 a.m. on 6 August 1945, the first atomic bomb to be used in war was dropped by the United States Army Air Forces from the Enola Gay, a B-29 bomber. The force of the atomic bomb effectively obliterated the city of Hiroshima, Japan.

Earlier, on 25 July, General Carl Spaatz, commander of the United States Strategic Air Forces in the Pacific, received orders to deliver a "special bomb" attack on selected cities in Japan. The first target city chosen was Hiroshima, which had an important port on southern Honshu and was headquarters of the Japanese Second General Army with 40,000 military personnel in the city. It was also the only large city that was not known to have a POW camp.

The bomb was assembled in secret and loaded on the Enola Gay. The bomb, code named "Little Boy", possessed a force equivalent to 15,000 tons of TNT. The plane dropped Little Boy over the city at 8:15:17 a.m local time on 6 August 1945. Intended for the Aioi Bridge, the bomb instead exploded directly over the Shima Hospital, which was very near to the Genbaku Dome. 

Because the explosion was almost directly overhead, the building was able to retain its shape. The building's vertical columns were able to resist the nearly vertical downward force of the blast, and parts of the concrete and brick outer walls remained intact. 

The center of the blast occurred  horizontally and  vertically from the Dome.  Everyone inside the building was killed instantly.  The building's durability can also be attributed to its earthquake-resistant design; it has held up to earthquakes before and since the bombing.

Post-Atomic Bombing

Preservation 

Due to its stone and steel structure, the building was one of the few structures left standing near the bomb's hypocenter. Soon commonly called the Genbaku ("A-Bomb") Dome, due to the exposed metal dome framework at its apex, the structure was scheduled to be demolished with the rest of the ruins, but the majority of the building was intact, delaying the demolition plans. The Dome became a subject of controversy, with some locals wanting it torn down, while others wanted to preserve it as a memorial of the bombing and a symbol of peace. Ultimately, when the reconstruction of Hiroshima began, the skeletal remains of the building were preserved.

From 1950 through 1964, the Hiroshima Peace Memorial Park was established around the Dome. The Hiroshima City Council adopted a resolution in 1966 on the permanent preservation of the Genbaku Dome, officially named the Hiroshima Peace Memorial (Genbaku Dome). The Dome continues to be the park's primary landmark.

Weathering and deterioration of the Genbaku Dome continued in the post-war period. The Hiroshima City Council declared in 1966 that it intended to indefinitely preserve the structure, now termed "Genbaku Dome". The first popularly elected mayor of Hiroshima, Shinzo Hamai (1905–1968) sought funds for the preservation effort domestically and internationally. During one trip to Tokyo, Hamai resorted to collecting funds directly on the streets of the capital. Preservation work on the Genbaku Dome was completed in 1967. The Genbaku Dome has undergone two minor preservation projects to stabilize the ruin, notably between October 1989 and March 1990.

The Genbaku Dome stands almost exactly as it did after the bombing on 6 August 1945.  Changes to the ruins, meant to ensure the stability of the structure, have been minimal.

UNESCO World Heritage Site 

In December 1996, the Genbaku Dome was registered on the UNESCO World Heritage List based on the Convention for the Protection of the World Cultural and Natural Heritage. Its inclusion into the UNESCO list was based on its survival from a destructive force (atomic bomb), the first use of nuclear weapons on a human population, and its representation as a symbol of peace.

Delegates to the World Heritage Committee from China and the United States had reservations regarding the confirmation of the memorial as a World Heritage Site. China cited the possibility that the monument could be used to downplay the fact that the victim countries of Japan's aggression suffered the greatest losses of life during the war, and the United States stated that having a memorial to a war site would omit the necessary historical context. The United States dissociated itself from the decision.

Gallery

See also 
 Hiroshima Witness
 Kaiser Wilhelm Memorial Church
 Coventry Cathedral
 Tourism in Japan
 List of World Heritage Sites in Japan
 The Ribbon International

References

External links 

 
 Entry on UNESCO (United Nations Educational, Scientific and Cultural Organization) website
 U.S. Attending 2010 Hiroshima Memorial   – video report by Democracy Now!

Cultural infrastructure completed in 1915
War monuments and memorials
Domes
Monuments and memorials in Japan
Monuments and memorials concerning the atomic bombings of Hiroshima and Nagasaki
Peace monuments and memorials
Tourist attractions in Hiroshima
World Heritage Sites in Japan
Buildings and structures in Hiroshima
Buildings and structures in Japan destroyed during World War II
Historic Sites of Japan
World War II memorials in Japan
Ruins in Japan